Synaptogenesis is the formation of synapses between neurons in the nervous system. Although it occurs throughout a healthy person's lifespan, an explosion of synapse formation occurs during early brain development, known as exuberant synaptogenesis. Synaptogenesis is particularly important during an individual's critical period, during which there is a certain degree of synaptic pruning due to competition for neural growth factors by neurons and synapses. Processes that are not used, or inhibited during their critical period will fail to develop normally later on in life.

Formation of the neuromuscular junction

Function
The neuromuscular junction (NMJ) is the most well-characterized synapse in that it provides a simple and accessible structure that allows for easy manipulation and observation. The synapse itself is composed of three cells: the motor neuron, the myofiber, and the Schwann cell. In a normally functioning synapse, a signal will cause the motor neuron to depolarize, by releasing the neurotransmitter acetylcholine (ACh). Acetylcholine travels across the synaptic cleft where it reaches acetylcholine receptors (AChR) on the plasma membrane of the myofiber, the sarcolemma. As the AChRs open ion channels, the membrane depolarizes, causing muscle contraction. The entire synapse is covered in
a myelin sheath provided by the Schwann cell to insulate and encapsulate the junction.
Another important part of the neuromuscular system and central nervous system are the astrocytes. While originally they were thought to have only functioned as support for the neurons, they play an important role in functional plasticity of synapses.

Origin and movement of cells
During development, each of the three germ layer cell types arises from different regions of the growing embryo. The individual myoblasts originate in the mesoderm and fuse to form a multi-nucleated myotube. During or shortly after myotube formation, motoneurons from the neural tube form preliminary contacts with the myotube. The Schwann cells arise from the neural crest and are led by the axons to their destination. Upon reaching it, they form a loose, unmyelinated covering over the innervating axons. The movement of the axons (and subsequently the Schwann cells) is guided by the growth cone, a filamentous projection of the axon that actively searches for neurotrophins released by the myotube.

The specific patterning of synapse development at the neuromuscular junction shows that the majority of muscles are innervated at their midpoints. Although it may seem that the axons specifically target the midpoint of the myotube, several factors reveal that this is not a valid claim. It appears that after the initial axonal contact, the newly formed myotube proceeds to grow symmetrically from that point of innervation. Coupled with the fact that AChR density is the result of axonal contact instead of the cause, the structural patterns of muscle fibers can be attributed to both myotatic growth as well as axonal innervation.

The preliminary contact formed between the motoneuron and the myotube generates synaptic transmission almost immediately, but the signal produced is very weak. There is evidence that Schwann cells may facilitate these preliminary signals by increasing the amount of spontaneous neurotransmitter release through small molecule signals. After about a week, a fully functional synapse is formed following several types of differentiation in both the post-synaptic muscle cell and the pre-synaptic motoneuron. This pioneer axon is of crucial importance because the new axons that follow have a high propensity for forming contacts with well-established synapses.

Post-synaptic differentiation
The most noticeable difference in the myotube following contact with the motoneuron is the increased concentration of AChR in the plasma membrane of the myotube in the synapse. This increased amount of AChR allows for more effective transmission of synaptic signals, which in turn leads to a more-developed synapse. The density of AChR is > 10,000/μm2 and approximately 10/μm2 around the edge. This high concentration of AChR in the synapse is achieved through clustering of AChR, up-regulation of the AChR gene transcription in the post-synaptic nuclei, and down-regulation of the AChR gene in the non-synaptic nuclei. The signals that initiate post-synaptic differentiation may be neurotransmitters released directly from the axon to the myotube, or they may arise from changes activated in the extracellular matrix of the synaptic cleft.

Clustering

AChR experiences multimerization within the post-synaptic membrane largely due to the signaling molecule Agrin. The axon of the motoneuron releases agrin, a proteoglycan that initiates a cascade that eventually leads to AChR association. Agrin binds to a muscle-specific kinase (MuSK) receptor in the post-synaptic membrane, and this in turn leads to downstream activation of the cytoplasmic protein Rapsyn. Rapsyn contains domains that allow for AChR association and multimerization, and it is directly responsible for AChR clustering in the post-synaptic membrane: rapsyn-deficient mutant mice fail to form AChR clusters.

Synapse-specific transcription

The increased concentration of AChR is not simply due to a rearrangement of pre-existing synaptic components. The axon also provides signals that regulate gene expression within the myonuclei directly beneath the synapse. This signaling provides for localized up-regulation of transcription of AChR genes and consequent increase in local AChR concentration. The two signaling molecules released by the axon are calcitonin gene-related peptide (CGRP) and neuregulin, which trigger a series of kinases that eventually lead to transcriptional activation of the AChR genes.

Extrasynaptic repression

Repression of the AChR gene in the non-synaptic nuclei is an activity-dependent process involving the electrical signal generated by the newly formed synapse. Reduced concentration of AChR in the extrasynaptic membrane in addition to increased concentration in the post-synaptic membrane helps ensure the fidelity of signals sent by the axon by localizing AChR to the synapse. Because the synapse begins receiving inputs almost immediately after the motoneuron comes into contact with the myotube, the axon quickly generates an action potential and releases ACh. The depolarization caused by AChR induces muscle contraction and simultaneously initiates repression of AChR gene transcription across the entire muscle membrane. Note that this affects gene transcription at a distance: the receptors that are embedded within the post-synaptic membrane are not susceptible to repression.

Pre-synaptic differentiation
Although the mechanisms regulating pre-synaptic differentiation are unknown, the changes exhibited at the developing axon terminal are well characterized. The pre-synaptic axon shows an increase in synaptic volume and area, an increase of synaptic vesicles, clustering of vesicles at the active zone, and polarization of the pre-synaptic membrane. These changes are thought to be mediated by neurotrophin and cell adhesion molecule release from muscle cells, thereby emphasizing the importance of communication between the motoneuron and the myotube during synaptogenesis. Like post-synaptic differentiation, pre-synaptic differentiation is thought to be due to a combination of changes in gene expression and a redistribution of pre-existing synaptic components. Evidence for this can be seen in the up-regulation of genes expressing vesicle proteins shortly after synapse formation as well as their localization at the synaptic terminal.

Synaptic maturation
Immature synapses are multiply innervated at birth, due to the high propensity for new axons to innervate at a pre-existing synapse. As the synapse matures, the synapses segregate and eventually all axonal inputs except for one retract in a process called synapse elimination. Furthermore, the post-synaptic end plate grows deeper and creates folds through invagination to increase the surface area available for neurotransmitter reception. At birth, Schwann cells form loose, unmyelinated covers over groups of synapses, but as the synapse matures, Schwann cells become dedicated to a single synapse and form a myelinated cap over the entire neuromuscular junction.

Synapse elimination

The process of synaptic pruning known as synapse elimination is a presumably activity-dependent process that involves competition between axons. Hypothetically, a synapse strong enough to produce an action potential will trigger the myonuclei directly across from the axon to release synaptotrophins that will strengthen and maintain well-established synapses. This synaptic strengthening is not conferred upon the weaker synapses, thereby starving them out. It has also been suggested that in addition to the synaptotrophins released to the synapse exhibiting strong activity, the depolarization of the post-synaptic membrane causes release of synaptotoxins that ward off weaker axons.

Synapse formation specificity
A remarkable aspect of synaptogenesis is the fact that motoneurons are able to distinguish between fast and slow-twitch muscle fibers; fast-twitch muscle fibers are innervated by "fast" motoneurons, and slow-twitch muscle fibers are innervated by "slow" motoneurons. There are two hypothesized paths by which the axons of motoneurons achieve this specificity, one in which the axons actively recognize the muscles that they innervate and make selective decisions based on inputs, and another that calls for more indeterminate innervation of muscle fibers. In the selective paths, the axons recognize the fiber type, either by factors or signals released specifically by the fast or slow-twitch muscle fibers. In addition, selectivity can be traced to the lateral position that the axons are predeterminately arranged in order to link them to the muscle fiber that they will eventually innervate. The hypothesized non-selective pathways indicate that the axons are guided to their destinations by the matrix through which they travel. Essentially, a path is laid out for the axon and the axon itself is not involved in the decision-making process. Finally, the axons may non-specifically innervate muscle fibers and cause the muscles to acquire the characteristics of the axon that innervates them. In this path, a "fast" motoneuron can convert any muscle fiber into a fast-twitch muscle fiber. There is evidence for both selective and non-selective paths in synapse formation specificity, leading to the conclusion that the process is a combination of several factors.

Central nervous system synapse formation
Although the study of synaptogenesis within the central nervous system (CNS) is much more recent than that of the NMJ, there is promise of relating the information learned at the NMJ to synapses within the CNS. Many similar structures and basic functions exist between the two types of neuronal connections. At the most basic level, the CNS synapse and the NMJ both have a nerve terminal that is separated from the postsynaptic membrane by a cleft containing specialized extracellular material. Both structures exhibit localized vesicles at the active sites, clustered receptors at the post-synaptic membrane, and glial cells that encapsulate the entire synaptic cleft. In terms of synaptogenesis, both synapses exhibit differentiation of the pre- and post-synaptic membranes following initial contact between the two cells. This includes the clustering of receptors, localized up-regulation of protein synthesis at the active sites, and neuronal pruning through synapse elimination.

Despite these similarities in structure, there is a fundamental difference between the two connections. The CNS synapse is strictly neuronal and does not involve muscle fibers: for this reason the CNS uses different neurotransmitter molecules and receptors. More importantly, neurons within the CNS often receive multiple inputs that must be processed and integrated for successful transfer of information. Muscle fibers are innervated by a single input and operate in an all or none fashion. Coupled with the plasticity that is characteristic of the CNS neuronal connections, it is easy to see how increasingly complex CNS circuits can become.

Factors regulating synaptogenesis in the CNS

Signaling

The main method of synaptic signaling in the NMJ is through use of the neurotransmitter acetylcholine and its receptor. The CNS homolog is glutamate and its receptors, and one of special significance is the N-methyl-D-aspartate (NMDA) receptor. It has been shown that activation of NMDA receptors initiates synaptogenesis through activation of downstream products. The heightened level of NMDA receptor activity during development allows for increased influx of calcium, which acts as a secondary signal. Eventually, immediate early genes (IEG) are activated by transcription factors and the proteins required for neuronal differentiation are translated. The NMDA receptor function is associated with the estrogen receptor in hippocampal neurons. Experiments conducted with estradiol show that exposure to the estrogen significantly increases synaptic density and protein concentration.

Synaptic signaling during synaptogenesis is not only activity-dependent, but is also dependent on the environment in which the neurons are located. For instance, brain-derived neurotrophic factor (BDNF) is produced by the brain and regulates several functions within the developing synapse, including enhancement of transmitter release, increased concentration of vesicles, and cholesterol biosynthesis. Cholesterol is essential to synaptogenesis because the lipid rafts that it forms provide a scaffold upon which numerous signaling interactions can occur. BDNF-null mutants show significant defects in neuronal growth and synapse formation. Aside from neurotrophins, cell-adhesion molecules are also essential to synaptogenesis. Often the binding of pre-synaptic cell-adhesion molecules with their post-synaptic partners triggers specializations that facilitate synaptogenesis. Indeed, a defect in genes encoding neuroligin, a cell-adhesion molecule found in the post-synaptic membrane, has been linked to cases of autism and mental retardation. Finally, many of these signaling processes can be regulated by matrix metalloproteinases (MMPs) as the targets of many MMPs are these specific cell-adhesion molecules.

Morphology

The special structure found in the CNS that allows for multiple inputs is the dendritic spine, the highly dynamic site of excitatory synapses. This morphological dynamism is due to the specific regulation of the actin cytoskeleton, which in turn allows for regulation of synapse formation. Dendritic spines exhibit three main morphologies: filopodia, thin spines, and mushroom spines. The filopodia play a role in synaptogenesis through initiation of contact with axons of other neurons. Filopodia of new neurons tend to associate with multiply synapsed axons, while the filopodia of mature neurons tend to sites devoid of other partners. The dynamism of spines allows for the conversion of filopodia into the mushroom spines that are the primary sites of glutamate receptors and synaptic transmission.

Environmental enrichment
Rats raised with environmental enrichment have 25% more synapses than controls. This effect occurs whether a more stimulating environment is experienced immediately following birth, after weaning, or during maturity.  Stimulation effects not only synaptogenesis upon pyramidal neurons but also stellate ones.

Contributions of the Wnt protein family

The (Wnt) family, includes several embryonic morphogens that contribute to early pattern formation in the developing embryo. Recently data have emerged showing that the Wnt protein family has roles in the later development of synapse formation and plasticity. Wnt contribution to synaptogenesis has been verified in both the central nervous system and the neuromuscular junction.

Central nervous system

Wnt family members contribute to synapse formation in the cerebellum by inducing presynaptic and postsynaptic terminal formation. This brain region contains three main neuronal cell types- Purkinje cells, granule cells and mossy fiber cells. Wnt-3 expression contributes to Purkinje cell neurite outgrowth and synapse formation. Granule cells express Wnt-7a to promote axon spreading and branching in their synaptic partner, mossy fiber cells. Retrograde secretion of Wnt-7a to mossy fiber cells causes growth cone enlargement by spreading microtubules. Furthermore, Wnt-7a retrograde signaling recruits synaptic vesicles and presynaptic proteins to the synaptic active zone. Wnt-5a performs a similar function on postsynaptic granule cells; this Wnt stimulates receptor assembly and clustering of the scaffolding protein PSD-95.

In the hippocampus Wnts in conjunction with cell electrical activity promote synapse formation. Wnt7b is expressed in maturing dendrites, and the expression of the Wnt receptor Frizzled (Fz), increases highly with synapse formation in the hippocampus. NMDA glutamate receptor activation increases Wnt2 expression. Long term potentiation (LTP) due to NMDA activation and subsequent Wnt expression leads to Fz-5 localization at the postsynaptic active zone. Furthermore, Wnt7a and Wnt2 signaling after NMDA receptor mediated LTP leads to increased dendritic arborization and regulates activity induced synaptic plasticity. Blocking Wnt expression in the hippocampus mitigates these activity dependent effects by reducing dendritic arborization and subsequently, synaptic complexity.

Neuromuscular junction

Similar mechanisms of action by Wnts in the central nervous system are observed in the neuromuscular junction (NMJ) as well. In the Drosophila NMJ mutations in the Wnt5 receptor Derailed (drl) reduce the number of and density of synaptic active zones. The major neurotransmitter in this system is glutamate. Wnt is needed to localize glutamatergic receptors on postsynaptic muscle cells. As a result, Wnt mutations diminish evoked currents on the postsynaptic muscle.

In the vertebrate NMJ, motor neuron expression of Wnt-11r contributes to acetylcholine receptor (AChR) clustering in the postsynaptic density of muscle cells. Wnt-3 is expressed by muscle fibers and is secreted retrogradely onto motor neurons. In motor neurons, Wnt-3 works with Agrin to promote growth cone enlargement, axon branching and synaptic vesicle clustering.

References

Developmental neuroscience